General of the Army Vladimir Anatolyevich Boldyrev (Russian: Владимир Анатольевич Болдырев; born January 5, 1949) was the Commander-in-Chief of the Russian Ground Forces (2008–2010).

Biography 
Boldyrev was born on 5 January 1949 in Krasnoyarsky, Volgograd Oblast. He graduated the Moscow Higher Military Command School in 1971, and Frunze Academy in 1978.

He served in various command positions in the Belorussian Military District, and later served in senior staff for operations department in the Transbaikal Military District. He later served as Commander of the 36th Army in 1994, and First Deputy Commander of the Transbaikal Military District in 1998.

In May 2001, he moved to position of the First Deputy Commander of the Siberian Military District, and later became commander. He transferred to the position of the Commander of the North Caucasus Military District in December 2002. He was promoted to the rank of General of the Army in December 2003.

In July 2004, he assumed position of the Commander of the Volga-Urals Military District, which was his third Military District commander position. He served at this position until he became Commander-in-Chief of the Ground Forces in August 2008. In 2010 he was discharged due to age limit.

External links
The Generals of the Russian Army Kommersant, February 25, 2005

Generals of the army (Russia)
1949 births
Living people
Frunze Military Academy alumni
Military Academy of the General Staff of the Armed Forces of Russia alumni